Igor Mikhailovich Luchenok (Belarusian: Iгар Міхайлавіч Лучанок, Ihar Michajlavič Lučanok, Russian: Игорь Михайлович Лученок; 6 August 1938 in Minsk — 12 November 2018 in Minsk) was a Belarusian composer, People's Artist of the Byelorussian SSR (and People's Artist of the USSR), and chairman of the Belarusian Union of Composers.

Biography 
Luchenok worked in various genres — vocal-symphonic, chamber-instrumental, chamber-vocal, but most fruitfully — in song. From his works formed the repertoire of Pesniary, Syabry, Verasy, Joseph Kobzon, Sofia Rotaru, Valentina Tolkunova, Maria Pakhomenko, Lev Leshchenko, Victor Vuyachich, Eduard Khil and many others.

References

External links
 Ігар Лучанок: Я дапамагаю не толькі сябрам, але нават і ворагам

1938 births
2018 deaths
Musicians from Minsk
Communist Party of the Soviet Union members
Republican Party of Labour and Justice politicians
Members of the Congress of People's Deputies of the Soviet Union
Belarusian composers
Soviet composers
Soviet male composers
Saint Petersburg Conservatory alumni
Moscow Conservatory alumni
People's Artists of the USSR
People's Artists of the Byelorussian Soviet Socialist Republic
Recipients of the Byelorussian SSR State Prize
Recipients of the Order of Francysk Skaryna
Recipients of the Lenin Komsomol Prize
Recipients of the Order of Friendship of Peoples
20th-century male musicians